The AMP Society Building is a historic building on Customhouse Quay, Wellington, New Zealand.

The Australian Mutual Provident society was founded in 1849 and established a branch on Featherston Street, Wellington in 1871. The AMP Society Building was built in 1928, and features a classical facade of grey New Zealand granite and sandstone from the Hawkesbury River in New South Wales.

The building is classified as a "Category I" ("places of special or outstanding historical or cultural heritage significance or value") historic place by the New Zealand Historic Places Trust.

It is currently occupied by the Sport New Zealand and other government entities.

References

Buildings and structures in Wellington City
Heritage New Zealand Category 1 historic places in the Wellington Region
1920s architecture in New Zealand